Arua is a town in Uganda.

Arua may also refer to:

Arua District, in Uganda
Aruá language (disambiguation)
Fred Arua, Papua New Guinean cricketer; see

See also

Aruaa
Arwa (disambiguation)